Willy Dobbe (born 2 January 1944 in The Hague) is a Dutch television announcer and former television presenter. She was the host of the 1970 Eurovision Song Contest and also presented the Dutch national finals for the 1971 and 1972 contests.

Career 

Dobbe was born in The Hague and obtained a degree as beautician. In 1967 she joined the broadcaster Nederlandse Omroep Stichting and became a television announcer, which she remained for 5 years before moving to the TROS in 1972.

In 1970, Dobbe was asked to host the Eurovision Song Contest in Amsterdam. She maintained her Eurovision connection for two more years, when she hosted the Nationaal Songfestival consecutively in 1971 and 1972. Dobbe also presented programmes such as School TV, WK Allround Dancing, and, most notably, Zevensprong. She remained associated with TV for the next two decades and retired in 1989, to make way for Linda de Mol.

Twice during her career, Dobbe was featured in the Dutch gossip magazine Story. Dutch director Wim T. Schippers created a fictional "Willy Dobbe plantsoen" (Willy Dobbe park) that figured in several of his satirical programs. In 1997, a real park was named after her in Olst, with Dobbe and Schippers both being present at its opening.

Heerlen has been her domicile for most of her life.

See also
List of Eurovision Song Contest presenters

References

External links 

 

1944 births
Living people
Dutch television presenters
Mass media people from The Hague
Nationaal Songfestival presenters